Mycobacterium microti
Member of the Mycobacterium tuberculosis complex (MTBC)
Also known as the 'Vole bacillus'
Etymology: microtus is a genus that includes small field rodents such as the vole. This mycobacterium species was first described as a pathogen of field voles in England

Description
Gram-positive, nonmotile, acid-fast rods.

Colony characteristics
Variable colony morphology, buff in colour, either rough or smooth.

Physiology
Slow growth on glycerol-free egg media at 37 °C often requiring incubation for 28–60 days. May adapt tolerance to glycerol. May fail to grow in liquid media.
Usually susceptible to the first line anti tuberculosis antibiotics isoniazid, ethambutol, rifampin, streptomycin and pyrazinamide.

Differential characteristics

Commercially available nucleic acid hybridisation assays are widely used to identify members of the M. tuberculosis complex..

Differentiation between individual members of the M tuberculosis complex is possible using a variety of molecular techniques, and individual strains within a species may be further distinguished using a variety of molecular typing methods.

Pathogenesis

Cause of naturally acquired generalized tuberculosis in voles and other mammals, including cats and new world camelids such as llamas. Human infections are rare, but do occur in both immunocompromised and apparently immunocompetent patients.

Type strain
Strain ATCC 19422 = CIP 104256 = NCTC 8710.

References

External links
Type strain of Mycobacterium microti at BacDive -  the Bacterial Diversity Metadatabase

Acid-fast bacilli
microti
Bacteria described in 1957